Freaks: Alive on the Inside (2006) is a young adult novel by Annette Curtis Klause.

Plot summary
The story is of a young man, Abel Dandy, who is born in a freak show to his "freak" parents. Growing up normally in a world of oddities is hard for Abel, for he wishes for some type of oddness to enable him to fit it. A departing pair of Siamese twins gives Abel a ring from ancient Egypt that seems to have been made for him. Soon he begins to have dreams of a mysterious dancing girl calling for him.

Abel leaves the show at the dead of night to find his fortune only to be followed by Apollo, the dog-boy. A chain of events lead off to Abel finding what he most desired, and a lesson that preaches: freak or not, we are all human.

References

2006 American novels
American fantasy novels
American romance novels
American adventure novels
American young adult novels
Human-mummy romance in fiction
Fiction about mummies
Young adult fantasy novels